Lucas Rodríguez may refer to:

 Lucas Rodríguez (footballer, born 1986), Argentine footballer
 Lucas Rodríguez (footballer, born 1997), Argentine footballer
 Lucas Rodríguez (footballer, born 1999), Uruguayan footballer
 Lucas Nahuel Rodríguez (born 1993), Argentine footballer